LMS may refer to:

Science and technology
 Labeled magnitude scale, a scaling technique
 Learning management system, education software
 Least mean squares filter, producing least mean square error
 Leiomyosarcoma, a rare form of cancer
 Lenz microphthalmia syndrome
 Computerised Library management system
 Licentiate in Medicine and Surgery, a degree in India
 LMS color space
 Laboratory information management system (but usually LIMS)

Organisations
 Latin Mass Society of England and Wales
 List of Marjan Šarec, a Slovenian political party
 London Mathematical Society
 London, Midland and Scottish Railway
 London Missionary Society
 League of Legends Master Series
 Loving Municipal Schools

Entertainment
 Last man standing (gaming), a type of video game
 LMS, family band of Denroy Morgan

Other uses
 Leamington Spa railway station  code, England
 Local Mitigation Strategy
 Local Management of Schools, in the Education Reform Act 1988
Loïc Mbe Soh, French footballer